Joona Kunnas (born January 8, 1993) is a Finnish professional ice hockey defenceman who plays for Anglet Hormadi Élite in the Ligue Magnus.

Kunnas previously played ten games in Liiga for Ilves during the 2016–17 season. On June 23, 2017, he joined Brûleurs de Loups of the Ligue Magnus in France. He then joined fellow French side Anglet Hormadi Élite on September 2, 2018. He re-signed with the team on June 7, 2019.

Before turning professional, Kunnas spent four seasons with the University of Connecticut Huskies men's ice hockey team.

References

External links

1993 births
Living people
Anglet Hormadi Élite players
Brûleurs de Loups players
UConn Huskies men's ice hockey players
Coquitlam Express players
Finnish ice hockey defencemen
Ilves players
Lempäälän Kisa players
Sportspeople from Vantaa
University of Connecticut alumni